Cerro El Potosí is the highest mountain in the Sierra Madre Oriental mountain range of northeast Mexico. It is located in the state of Nuevo León, about 80 km (50 mi) south of Monterrey.

Flora and fauna
It is composed of limestone, and is noted for its very diverse flora including several endemic or near-endemic species, such as the Potosi Pinyon. At the foot of the mountain, a series of springs and endorheic basins were the only site in which the pupfish Cyprinodon alvarezi and Megupsilon aporus, and the dwarf crayfish Cambarellus alvarezi lived. The last two are entirely extinct, while Cyprinodon alvarezi is extinct in the wild (only survives in captivity).

Access
Access was very difficult in the past, but in the 1960s a microwave relay station was built on the summit, with the road built for this providing easy access from the east.

Protected areas
In 2000 the upper slopes of the mountain were designated an ecological reserve, covering 9.02 km2. A northern portion of the mountain, including the actual summit, are in the Cuenca Alimentadora del Distrito Nacional de Riego 026 Bajo Río San Juan, a natural resources protection area.

See also
Mountain peaks of México
Mountain peaks of North America
List of Ultras of Mexico

References

External links
 "Cerro el Potosí, Mexico" on Peakbagger

Potosi
Landforms of Nuevo León
Sierra Madre Oriental
North American 3000 m summits
Protected areas of the Sierra Madre Oriental
Important Bird Areas of Mexico